Ihor Anatoliiovych Dudnyk (born 9 August 1985) is a retired Ukrainian professional football defender.

Career
On 11 February 2009, Luch-Energia Vladivostok signed him from Terek Grozny, he moved with Russian central defender and teammate Anatoli Romanovich. In April 2010 he was signed by the Latvian side FC Daugava but left the team in August the same year, joining FC Feniks-Illichovets Kalinine. In April 2011 he came back to Latvia, signing with FC Daugava once again. In June, he signed for FC Metalurh Zaporizhzhia.

External links
 Profile by RPL
 

1985 births
Living people
Ukrainian footballers
Ukrainian expatriate footballers
Expatriate footballers in Russia
Expatriate footballers in Latvia
FC Metalurh Zaporizhzhia players
FC Metalurh-2 Zaporizhzhia players
FC Hoverla Uzhhorod players
FC Olimpik Donetsk players
FC Akhmat Grozny players
FC Feniks-Illichovets Kalinine players
Russian Premier League players
FC Krasnodar players
FC Daugava players
FC Tavria-Skif Rozdol players
Crimean Premier League players
Association football defenders
FC Lada-Tolyatti players
Sportspeople from Zaporizhzhia Oblast